Mascagni is a surname of Italian origin. Notable people with the surname include:

 Donato Mascagni (1579–1636), Italian painter
 Paolo Mascagni (1755–1815), Italian physician
 Pietro Mascagni (1863–1945), Italian composer

Surnames of Italian origin